Lee Ho-jung may refer to:
 Lee Ho-jung (figure skater)
 Lee Ho-jung (actress)